A formal act of defection from the Catholic Church was an externally provable juridic act of departure from the Catholic Church, which was recognized from 1983 to 2010 in the Code of Canon Law as having certain juridical effects enumerated in canons 1086, 1117, and 1124. The concept of "formal" act of defection was narrower than that of "notorious" (publicly known) defection recognized in the 1917 Code of Canon Law and still narrower than the concept of "de facto" defection. In 2006, the Pontifical Council for Legislative Texts specified in what a formal act of defection from the Catholic Church consisted. Despite popular perception this act did not constitute leaving the Catholic Church and did not make an individual a former Catholic.  

In 2009, after Omnium in mentem, all mention of a formal act of defection from the Catholic Church and of any juridical effects deriving from it was removed from the Code.

Procedure from 2006 to 2009

Between 1983 and 2006, the Catholic Church in Germany and some other countries treated as a formal act of defection from the Catholic Church the declaration that some made to the civil authorities for the purpose of avoiding the extra tax traditionally collected by the state for the benefit of whatever Church the tax-payer was a member of. The Church in those countries considered people who made this declaration as no longer entitled to the privileges of membership of the Church, such as having a wedding in church.

The 2006 notification ruled that such declarations did not necessarily indicate a decision to abandon the Church in reality. It laid down that only the competent bishop or parish priest was to judge whether the person genuinely intended to leave the Church through an act of apostasy, heresy, or schism. It also pointed out that single acts of apostasy, heresy or schism (which can be repented) do not necessarily involve also a decision to leave the Church, and so "do not in themselves constitute a formal act of defection if they are not externally concretized and manifested to the ecclesiastical authority in the required manner."

The notification required therefore that the decision to leave the Church had to be manifested personally, consciously and freely, and in writing, to the competent Church authority, who was then to judge whether it was genuinely a case of "true separation from the constitutive elements of the life of the Church … (by) an act of apostasy, heresy or schism."

If the bishop or parish priest decided that the individual had indeed made a formal act of defection from the Catholic Church – making a decision on this matter would normally require a meeting with the person involved – the fact of this formal act was to be noted in the register of the person's baptism. This annotation, like other annotations in the baptismal register, such as those of marriage or ordination, was unrelated to the fact of the baptism: it was not a debaptism (a term sometimes used journalistically): the fact of having been baptized remained a fact, and the Catholic Church holds that baptism marks a person with a seal or character that "is an ontological and permanent bond which is not lost by reason of any act or fact of defection".

Abrogation
The motu proprio Omnium in mentem of 26 October 2009 removed from the canons in question all reference to an act of formal defection from the Catholic Church. Accordingly, "it is no longer appropriate to enter attempts at formal defection in the sacramental records since this juridic action is now abolished."

In late August 2010, the Holy See confirmed that it was no longer possible to defect formally from the Catholic Church. However, the Roman Catholic Archdiocese of Dublin declared on 12 October 2010 that it intended to keep a register of those who expressed the wish to defect. Since this fell short of making an annotation in the baptismal register, CountMeOut (an association in the archdiocese that had been promoting formal defections from the Catholic Church) thereupon ceased to provide defection forms.

Although the act of "formal defection" from the Catholic Church has thus been abolished, public or "notorious" (in the canonical sense) defection from the Catholic faith or from the communion of the Church is of course possible, as is expressly recognized in the Code of Canon Law. Even defection that is not known publicly is subject to the automatic spiritual penalty of excommunication laid down in canon 1364 of the Code of Canon Law. However, when determining if a marriage is lawfully celebrated, Catholic baptism is now the sole determinant of public membership in the Catholic Church.

See also
List of former Roman Catholics

References

External links

Official documents
Ruling by Holy See on the matter (13 March 2006)
English translation of Omnium in mentem removing from the Code of Canon Law the formal act of defection
Abolition of the process

Catholic theology and doctrine
Canon law history
Catholic canon law of persons
Catholic Church legal terminology